The surnames Bitter, de Bitter or Von Bitter may refer to:

 Billy Bitter (born 1988), an American lacrosse player
 Francis Bitter (1902–1967), an American physicist who invented the Bitter electromagnet, which uses circular metal plates instead of wire coils
 Friedrich August Georg Bitter (1873–1927), a German botanist and lichenologist
 Johannes Bitter (born 1982), a German team handball player
 Karl Bitter (1867–1915), an Austrian-born United States sculptor
 Karl Hermann Bitter (1813–1885), Prussian statesman
  (1919–1945), Dutch resistance fighter forced to collaborate with the German regime after his capture
  
 Peter von Bitter (living), a German-born Canadian palaeontologist
 Pieter de Bitter (ca. 1620–1666), a 17th-century Dutch officer of the Dutch East India Company
 Susan Bitter Smith (living), an Arizona Republican politician
 Theo Bitter (1916–1994), a Dutch graphic artist, painter and draftsman.

See also
 Bitter (disambiguation)